Events from 1934 in Catalonia.

Incumbents

 President of the Generalitat of Catalonia – Lluís Companys (suspended from 7 October)

Events
 1 January – Lluís Companys is elected and appointed President of the Generalitat.
 14 January – Catalan local elections.
 21 March – The Parliament approve the Law of the Court of Appeal of Catalonia.
 11 April – The Parliament approve the Crop Contracts Law.
 8 June – The Constitutional Court of Spain annulled the Crop Contract Law.
 9 June – Creation of the Council of Culture of the Generalitat.
 12 June – The Parliament approve again the Crop Contract Law as a response to the annullation.
 6 October – Events of 6 October, where Lluís Companys proclaimed the Catalan State as a response to the accession of the CEDA to the government of the Republic.
 7 October – the Catalan State is suppressed by the Spanish Army led by general Batet. Catalan Government is arrested and self-government suspended.
 11 November – Inauguration of the Art Museum of Catalonia.

Sport
 16 June – Volta a Catalunya begins.
 24 June – Volta a Catalunya ends, won by Bernardo Rogora.

References